María Ángeles Parejo Jiménez is a former Spanish football striker who developed her career in Italy's Serie A, playing for ACF Torino, Torres CF, Atlético Oristano, Olbia CF, GS Roma and Reggiana between 1988 and 2011. She also played for Takarazuka Bunny in Japan's L. League. Her best season was 1997–98, when she scored 38 goals in 23 matches.

She was a member of the Spain women's national football team, and played the 1997 European Championship where she scored 3 goals to help Spain reach the semifinals. She was included in the competition's all-star team.

Career statistics

References

1969 births
Living people
Spanish women's footballers
Spain women's international footballers
CE Sabadell Femení players
Serie A (women's football) players
Torres Calcio Femminile players
Footballers from Terrassa
Expatriate women's footballers in Italy
Expatriate women's footballers in Japan
Spanish expatriate footballers
Spanish expatriate sportspeople in Italy
Spanish expatriate sportspeople in Japan
Bunnys Kyoto SC players
Nadeshiko League players
A.S.D. Reggiana Calcio Femminile players
Women's association football forwards
Torino Women A.S.D. players
Roma Calcio Femminile players